Chudleigh Cavern is a limestone cave outside the town of Chudleigh in Devon, England. The cave is deep and contains stalactites. A small part is open to the public as a show cave. The rest is open only to experienced cavers.

Description
The entrance to the cave is found in a public garden, the Rock House Garden, a protected "triple Site of Scientific Interest," so designated by English Nature. The first part is open to the public, and contains several plants or lichens. The public section ends in a barrier, beyond which is a shaft. After the shaft a tight passage leads to some cave formations and a dead end.

Flora and fauna
The cave is home to Belba pulveruleuta, a mite.

References

External links
Showcaves of Great Britain: The Rock Gardens

Caves of Devon
Chudleigh